Wendy Glazier is an English-speaking Canadian actress (region of Toronto). She is mainly known in the world of web series as Theresa LeMay, one of the main roles in the many-times-awarded LGBT web series Out With Dad.

Filmography

Cinema

Movies 
 2009 - Son of the Sunshine : Bank Teller
 2014 - The Hotel Dieu : Dawn

Short films 
 2012 - Green Apple : Amanda Wellington

Internet

Webseries 
 2010/... - Out With Dad (including Vanessa's Story, Dir. : Jason Leaver) : Theresa LeMay 
 2012-2013 - Clutch (S2E02, S2E06, S2E09) : Agatha

Nominations and awards 
She was nominated and received the following awards:

2012 
3rd Indie Soap Awards (2012) (1 only winner in a category)
 Nominations: Best Breakthrough Performance (All shows) for " Out with Dad "

LA Web Series Festival 2012 (multiple prizes in the same category)
 Award : Outstanding Ensemble Cast in a Drama for " Out with Dad " :
 Kate Conway, Will Conlon, Lindsey Middleton, Corey Lof, Laura Jabalee, Darryl Dinn, Jacob Ahearn, Wendy Glazier, Robert Nolan.

 Academy of WebTelevision Awards 2013
 Nomination : Best Ensemble Performance for " Out with Dad "

2015 
 Academy of WebTelevision Awards 2015
 Award : Best Ensemble Performance for " Out with Dad "

External links 
 IMDB, Wendy Glazier
 Out with Dad, Cast

References 

Living people
Canadian film actresses
Canadian stage actresses
Canadian web series actresses
21st-century Canadian actresses
Year of birth missing (living people)